"Friends" is a song written and originally recorded by British vocalist and musician Terry Reid, released on his eponymous album in August 1969. It was included as a medley with a cover of Bob Dylan's "Highway 61 Revisited", in which "Friends" was sandwiched in between the two halves of the Dylan song.

Arrival version 

In November 1969, pop rock band Arrival released a cover of "Friends" as their debut single. The song featured lead vocals by Dyan Birch and was arranged by Arrival and Paul Buckmaster. It peaked at number 8 on the UK Singles Chart in January 1970.

Reception 
Reviewing for New Musical Express, Derek Johnson wrote that Birch has a "great presence and her vital soul-flecked styling is enhanced by powerful harmonies from the rest of the team. The backing piano, underlying deep-throated strings and walloping beat is impressive and the material is way above average. A very good disc indeed". However, guest reviewing for Melody Maker, Jon Lord of Deep Purple wrote that "there are so many songs with that sort of beginning and that sort or chorus line" and that "there is nothing special about it".

Charts

References 

1969 songs
1969 singles
Decca Records singles